Kumara Rama (1290 - 1320) is a revered as an historical figure in the history of Karnataka state and the inspiration for the establishment of the Vijayanagar Empire. Kumara Rama was the son of the chief Kampli Raya of Kampli or Kampli Kote (Kampli Fort). Kampli is a town in the Bellary district of Karnataka and it's a head quarter of Kampli Taluk. Harihara I and Bukka Raya I, the founders of great Vijayanagara Empire were the nephews of prince Kumara Rama. The mother of these two brothers was Maravve Nayakiti the elder sister of prince Kumara Rama.

As a Prince 
Kumara Rama (1290-1320), was an ideal prince and an embodiment of good virtues, who stood by his father in waging relentless wars against the Kakatiya dynasty of Warangal, Hoysala, and Muhammad bin Tughlaq of northern India. Kumara Rama died at a very young age battling the Muslim armies of Tughlaq and was an inspiration for the foundation of the Vijayanagar empire.

Worship in his name 
Several tribes in Karnataka worship Kumara Rama in whose honor many medieval temples were built. There is a temple called located in village Mensi in Siddapur Taluk of  Uttara Kannada district. Every year surrounding villagers worship Kumara Rama on an auspicious day by keeping his masks and Trojan horse.

A Temple build in Koratagere ,Tumkur

Personal life 
Kumara Rama falls in love with an aboriginal girl who later becomes his father's wife due to unusual circumstances. Though Rama takes this development as a fall out of destiny, the lady does not reconcile to her fate and tries to seduce Rama. But Rama stands out for morals and will be humiliated by his mother. Then he becomes the victim of his lover's tricks and Kampila Raja orders for his execution. But his look-alike brother Chenniga Rama sacrifices his life for him and Kumara Rama wages wars against the invasion of Tughlaq's army. He dies in the battle and his dignity is restored in his death.

Movie 
A Kannada movie was made in honour of the exploits of Kumara Rama called as Gandugali Kumara Rama. Shivaraj Kumar, the popular Kannada actor portrayed the role of Kumara Rama. The same role was earlier portrayed by Vishnuvardhan in a play sequence of the 1978 movie Madhura Sangama.

See also
 Kampli
 Kummata Durga
 Origin of Vijayanagara Empire

External links
Karnataka History

Vijayanagara Empire